Rongyu Group Co., Ltd. is a Chinese listed company based in Jilin City, Jilin Province. as at 8 November 2016, the company was a constituent of SZSE 1000 Index (as well as sub-index SZSE 700 Index) but not in SZSE Component Index, making the company was ranked between the 501st to 1,000th by free float adjusted market capitalization.

Business overview
The company was a producer of energy meters, permanent magnetic AC contactor, moulded case circuit breaker (MCCB), miniature circuit breaker (MCB) and high voltage vacuum breaker. However, the company was under reconstruction since 2015, seeking new area of investment.

In September 2015 the company also announced that they would acquire a company that operates icardpay.com, an online payment system. However, the deal was terminated by the board of directors in June 2016.

The takeover bid was €520 million.

In November 2016 the company was renamed into Rongyu Group.

Ownership
In 2015 the largest shareholder of the company, former chairman Lu Yongxiang, sold his 23.81% stake to a private equity fund (literally Guangzhou Huiyin Rifeng Investment Partnership (Limited Partnership)) The deal was completed in 2016. A joint venture of Ping An Insurance and UOB Asset Management, Ping An – UOB Fund Management, was a limited partner of Guangzhou Huiyin Rifeng for 99.9996% stake. The general partner and the manager of the fund was Guangzhou Huiyin Aofeng. The largest shareholder of the management company was the Government of Guangzhou City for 30.68% stake.

Subsidiaries
  (100%)
  (100%)
  (100%)

References

External links
 

Technology companies of China
Companies listed on the Shenzhen Stock Exchange
Companies based in Jilin
Chinese companies established in 1993
Civilian-run enterprises of China
Chinese brands